Rev. Thierry de Roucy (born 1957, near Compiègne, France) is the Founder and Chairman of Heart's Home, a Catholic Movement which promotes a "Culture of Compassion". 
In 2013, he was appointed as an Officer of the French order of the Légion d'Honneur.

His work is inspired by the conviction that loneliness and the feeling of being unloved are the greatest poverties.
Thierry de Roucy was 18 when he entered the religious congregation of the Servants of Jesus and Mary in France. He received his bachelor and master of Philosophy from the Institute of Comparative Philosophy in Paris.  He is an alumnus of the Pontifical University of St. Thomas Aquinas Angelicum in Rome where he earned a Master of Theology. He was ordained a priest in 1983. From 1988 to 2001, he was the Superior General of his congregation.

In 1990, he founded Heart's Home, a movement striving to bring consolation and compassion to the most wounded people and to restore their dignity through friendship and grassroots services. Since the movement was founded, about 1,400 volunteers of 41 nationalities have been recruited, formed and sent forth by Heart's Home as of March 2013. At the request of former Heart's Home volunteers, Thierry de Roucy founded three new branches of the organization: in 1994, the Servants of God's Presence, a congregation of religious sisters affiliated with Heart's Home; in 1995, the Heart's Home Permanent Members - for lay consecrated men and women - and the Sacerdotal Molokai Fraternity - for seminarians and priests.

Thierry de Roucy also founded a publishing house, "Les éditions du Serviteur", and published about 20 books including his own essays and translated works of Adrienne von Speyr, Hans Urs von Balthasar and Catherine Doherty (among others). Thierry de Roucy is invited all around the world to participate in conferences and to talk about Heart's Home. He has published several essays on spirituality and theology.

In the United-States, Thierry de Roucy opened three centers: a Heart's Home in Brooklyn, New York, provides assistance and support to isolated and challenged individuals from local Housing Projects, Nursing Homes, Hospitals and Shelters;  a Heart's Home on the campus of Gonzaga University, in Spokane, Washington; the International Center for a Culture of Compassion located upstate New York (United States).

Today, Thierry de Roucy shares his time between the International Center for a Culture of Compassion. and his travels around the world to open new foundations and to visit the 41 Heart's Home houses and the 2 Heart's Home villages located in 23 countries as of March 2013.

Thought and Spirituality

Thierry de Roucy's spirituality is rooted in both the Gospel and his experience besides the poorest. The main points of his thought and spirituality are:
 the humanity of Jesus-Christ and his filial relationship of obedience to the Father within the Holy Trinity;
 the compassion of Mary: "standing at the foot of the cross" (Jn 19,25), she faithfully takes part in Jesus' Passion;
 the Holy Saturday as the climax of the Passion that culminates in the silence of death (Adrienne von Speyr), sorrowful mystery in which Jesus experiences the deepest human suffering: loneliness and the feeling of the absurdity of life;
 the sacraments - and particularly the Confession and the Eucharist - as encounters with the Risen Christ and as a participation in his mission;
 the gratuity of presence and friendship as the answer to the thirst of the human heart and as the ultimate manifestation of God's compassion;
 the loving attention to "small things" (Catherine Doherty) as a sign and an expression of love towards the whole reality inasmuch as it is good, beautiful and true;
 education as a growth of the whole person (intelligence, freedom and affectivity) in his or her relationship to the real and desire of infinite;
 culture in general, and especially art, as a quest and an expression of the Absolute.
Thierry de Roucy's thought is anchored in the tradition of the Catholic Church. He was inspired, among many others, by the lives and the spiritual or theological works of Adrienne von Speyr, Hans Urs von Balthasar, Father Thomas Philippe, Luigi Giussani, Maurice Zundel, don Le Saux (Swami Abishiktananda), Catherine Doherty and Charles de Foucauld. The teachings of the Popes, particularly John-Paul II and Benedict XVI, are a constant reference in his writings.

Controversy
On 9 April 2013, the French newspaper La Croix reported that de Roucy had been convicted by the Ecclesiastical Court of Lyon (France) of sexual abuse and abuse of power towards an adult person after seven years of a complex trial during which he pleaded not guilty. This case has never been brought to a Civil Court. La Croix noted that the conviction took place in 2011 for a case dating back to 1996–97.

The Vatican removed him from the clerical state in 2018.

References

Recipients of the Legion of Honour
Christian organizations established in the 20th century
1957 births
Living people
Catholic Church sexual abuse scandals in France
French Roman Catholic priests
Laicized Roman Catholic priests